"Firm Foundation (He Won't)" is a song by American Contemporary Christian musician and worship leader Cody Carnes. The song was released on December 10, 2021, as a single. Carnes co-wrote the song with Chandler Moore and Austin Davis. Austin Davis produced the single.

The song was covered by Maverick City Music, with Chandler Moore and Cody Carnes featuring on their track. The Maverick City Music rendition peaked at No. 33 on the US Hot Christian Songs chart, and No. 10 on the Hot Gospel Songs chart.

Background
Cody Carnes released "Firm Foundation (He Won't)" on December 10, 2021. The song was his third and final single of 2021, following the releases of "Too Good to Not Believe" alongside Brandon Lake and "Hope of the Ages" with Hillsong Worship and Reuben Morgan. Carnes shared the inspiration behind the song, saying:

Composition

Critical reception
Joshua Andre of 365 Days of Inspiring Media gave a positive review of the song, saying: "The long and short of it is that "Firm Foundation (He Won't)", is a song that we all need to hear. Catchy in its delivery, and poppy in its musical style; it is the lyrics that really hit home for me." Jono Davies, reviewing for Louder Than The Music, said of the song: "As a song overall this does what it says on the tin, a strong worship song with a strong and powerful message that I hope you take heart from. Cody is a great worship leader and is a great blessing and with this song he has made another great song that will touch peoples lives."

Commercial performance
"Firm Foundation (He Won't)" made its debut at No. 50 on the US Christian Airplay chart dated April 23, 2022.

Music video
The lyric video of "Firm Foundation (He Won't)" was published on December 10, 2021, on Cody Carnes' YouTube channel.

Personnel
Credits adapted from AllMusic.

 Dan Alber — bass
 Jonathan Baines — choir/chorus
 Cody Carnes — primary artist, acoustic guitar
 Tamar Chipp — choir/chorus
 Chad Chrisman — A&R
 Austin Davis — background vocals, drums, electric guitar, engineer, keyboards, percussion, producer, vocal engineer
 Garrett Davis — A&R
 David Dennis — choir/chorus
 Olivia Grasso — background vocals, choir/chorus
 Jessica Hall — choir/chorus
 Matt Huber — mixing
 Kari Jobe — background vocals
 Nicole Johnson — choir/chorus
 Benji Kurokose — choir/chorus
 Shantrice Laura — background vocals, choir/chorus
 Brenton Miles — engineer, vocal engineer
 Scott Mills — electric guitar
 Noah Moreno — choir/chorus
 Sam Moses — mastering engineer
 Grant Pittman — keyboards, organ, piano
 Edwin Portillo — vocal engineer
 Bria Valderrama — choir/chorus

Charts

Release history

Maverick City Music version

On January 3, 2022, Maverick City Music released their version of "Firm Foundation (He Won't)" featuring Chandler Moore and Cody Carnes.

Composition

Commercial performance
"Firm Foundation (He Won't)" debuted at No. 49 on the US Hot Christian Songs, and No. 20 on the Hot Gospel Songs charts dated January 15, 2022.

Music video
The officlal music video of "Firm Foundation (He Won't)" was released on January 3, 2022, via Tribl Records' YouTube channel. The music video was filmed in Chicago, during Maverick City's national tour on October 1, 2021.

Charts

Weekly charts

Year-end charts

Release history

References

External links
  on PraiseCharts

2021 singles
2021 songs
Cody Carnes songs
Maverick City Music songs
Chandler Moore songs
Songs written by Cody Carnes
Songs written by Chandler Moore